Mindanaona mindanaonis is a species of beetle in the family Cerambycidae, and the only species in the genus Mindanaona. It was described by Stephan von Breuning in 1958.

References

Pteropliini
Beetles described in 1958